For the movie of the same name, see Americathon.

Tracks

External links
 information from soundtrackcollector.com
 [ All Music Guide]
 IMDb listing | soundtrack
 SoundtrackCollector.com

1979 soundtrack albums
Comedy film soundtracks